The mile, sometimes the international mile or statute mile to distinguish it from other miles, is a British imperial unit and United States customary unit of distance; both are based on the older English unit of length equal to 5,280 English feet, or 1,760 yards. The statute mile was standardised between the British Commonwealth and the United States by an international agreement in 1959, when it was formally redefined with respect to SI units as exactly .

With qualifiers, mile is also used to describe or translate a wide range of units derived from or roughly equivalent to the Roman mile, such as the nautical mile (now  exactly), the Italian mile (roughly ), and the Chinese mile (now  exactly). The Roman mile (mīlle passūs, noun, a Roman mile of 8 stadia (“stades”); 1,000 passūs (“paces”); or 5,000 pedēs (“feet”), approximately 4,854 English feet). This form of the mile then spread across the British Empire, some successor states of which continue to employ the mile. The US Geological Survey now employs the metre for official purposes, but legacy data from its 1927 geodetic datum has meant that a separate US survey mile  continues to see some use, although it was officially phased out in 2022. While most countries replaced the mile with the kilometre when switching to the International System of Units (SI), the international mile continues to be used in some countries, such as Liberia, the United Kingdom, the United States, and a number of countries with fewer than one million inhabitants, most of which are UK or US territories or have close historical ties with the UK or US.

Name 
The modern English word mile derives from Middle English  and Old English , which was cognate with all other Germanic terms for miles. These derived from the nominal ellipsis form of  'mile' or  'miles', the Roman mile of one thousand paces.

The present international mile is usually what is understood by the unqualified term mile. When this distance needs to be distinguished from the nautical mile, the international mile may also be described as a land mile or statute mile. Under American law, however, statute mile refers to the US survey mile. Foreign and historical units translated into English as miles usually employ a qualifier to describe the kind of mile being used but this may be omitted if it is obvious from the context, such as a discussion of the 2nd-century Antonine Itinerary describing its distances in terms of miles rather than Roman miles.

Abbreviation
The mile has been variously abbreviated in English—with and without a trailing period—as "mi", "M", "ml", and "m". The American National Institute of Standards and Technology now uses and recommends "mi" to avoid confusion with the SI metre (m) and millilitre (ml). However, derived units such as miles per hour or miles per gallon continue to be abbreviated as "mph" and "mpg" rather than "mi/h" and "mi/gal". In the United Kingdom, road signs use "m" as the abbreviation for mile though height and width restrictions also use "m" as the symbol for the metre, which may be displayed alongside feet and inches. The BBC style holds that "there is no acceptable abbreviation for 'miles'" and so it should be spelled out when used in describing areas.

Historical

Roman
The Roman mile ( "thousand paces";  m.p.; also  and ) consisted of a thousand paces as measured by every other step—as in the total distance of the left foot hitting the ground 1,000 times. The ancient Romans, marching their armies through uncharted territory, would often push a carved stick in the ground after each 1,000 paces. Well-fed and harshly driven Roman legionaries in good weather thus created longer miles. The distance was indirectly standardised by Agrippa's establishment of a standard Roman foot (Agrippa's own) in 29 BC, and the definition of a pace as 5 feet. An Imperial Roman mile thus denoted 5,000 Roman feet. Surveyors and specialised equipment such as the decempeda and dioptra then spread its use.

In Hellenic areas of the Empire, the Roman mile (mílion) was used beside the native Greek units as equivalent to 8 stadia of 600 Greek feet. The mílion continued to be used as a Byzantine unit and was also used as the name of the zero mile marker for the Byzantine Empire, the Milion, located at the head of the Mese near Hagia Sophia.

The Roman mile also spread throughout Europe, with its local variations giving rise to the different units below.

Also arising from the Roman mile is the milestone. All roads radiated out from the Roman Forum throughout the Empire – 50,000 (Roman) miles of stone-paved roads. At every mile was placed a shaped stone. Originally these were obelisks made from granite, marble, or whatever local stone was available. On these was carved a Roman numeral, indicating the number of miles from the centre of Rome – the Forum. Hence, one always knew how far one was from Rome.

Italian
The Italian mile ( ) was traditionally considered a direct continuation of the Roman mile, equal to 1000 paces, although its actual value over time or between regions could vary greatly. It was often used in international contexts from the Middle Ages into the 17th century and is thus also known as the "geographical mile", although the geographical mile is now a separate standard unit.

Arabic

The Arabic mile (al-mīl) was not the common Arabic unit of length; instead, Arabs and Persians traditionally used the longer parasang or "Arabic league". The Arabic mile was, however, used by medieval geographers and scientists and constituted a kind of precursor to the nautical or geographical mile. It extended the Roman mile to fit an astronomical approximation of 1 arcminute of latitude measured directly north-and-south along a meridian. Although the precise value of the approximation remains disputed, it was somewhere between 1.8 and 2.0 km.

English

The "old English mile" of the medieval and early modern periods varied but seems to have measured about 1.3 international miles (2.1 km). The old English mile varied over time and location within England. The old English mile has also been defined as 79,200 or 79,320 inches (1.25 or 1.2519 statute miles). The English long continued the Roman computations of the mile as 5000 feet, 1000 paces, or 8 longer divisions, which they equated with their "furrow's length" or furlong.

The origins of English units are "extremely vague and uncertain", but seem to have been a combination of the Roman system with native British and Germanic systems both derived from multiples of the barleycorn. Probably by the reign of Edgar in the 10th century, the nominal prototype physical standard of English length was an arm-length iron bar (a yardstick) held by the king at Winchester; the foot was then one-third of its length. Henry I was said to have made a new standard in 1101 based on his own arm. Following the issuance of Magna Carta, the barons of Parliament directed John and his son to keep the king's standard measure and weight at the Exchequer, which thereafter verified local standards until its abolition in the 19th century. New brass standards are known to have been constructed under Henry VII and Elizabeth I.

Arnold's  Customs of London recorded a mile shorter than previous ones, coming to 0.947 international miles (5000 feet) or 1.524 km.

Statute

 
The English statute mile was established by a Weights and Measures Act of Parliament in 1593 during the reign of Queen Elizabeth I. The act on the Composition of Yards and Perches had shortened the length of the foot and its associated measures, causing the two methods of determining the mile to diverge. Owing to the importance of the surveyor's rod in deeds and surveying undertaken under Henry VIII, decreasing the length of the rod by  would have amounted to a significant tax increase. Parliament instead opted to maintain the mile of 8 furlongs (which were derived from the rod) and to increase the number of feet per mile from the old Roman value. The applicable passage of the statute reads: "A Mile shall contain eight Furlongs, every Furlong forty Poles, and every Pole shall contain sixteen Foot and  half." The statute mile therefore contained 5,280 feet or 1,760 yards. The distance was not uniformly adopted. In both cases, the traditional local units remained longer than the statute mile. The English statute mile was superseded in 1959 by the international mile by international agreement.

Welsh
The Welsh mile ( or ) was 3 miles and 1,470 yards long (6.17 km). It comprised 9,000 paces, each of 3 Welsh feet of 9 inches. (The Welsh inch is usually reckoned as equivalent to the English inch.) Along with other Welsh units, it was said to have been codified under Dyfnwal the Bald and Silent and retained unchanged by Hywel the Good. Along with other Welsh units, it was discontinued following the conquest of Wales by Edward I of England in the 13th century.

Scots

The Scots mile was longer than the English mile, as mentioned by Robert Burns in the first verse of his poem "Tam o' Shanter". It comprised 8 (Scots) furlongs divided into 320 falls or faws (Scots rods). It varied from place to place but the most accepted equivalencies are 1,976 Imperial yards (1.123 statute miles or 1.81 km).

It was legally abolished three times: first by a 1685 act of the Scottish Parliament, again by the 1707 Treaty of Union with England, and finally by the Weights and Measures Act 1824. It had continued in use as a customary unit through the 18th century but had become obsolete by its final abolition.

Irish

The Irish mile ( or ) measured 2,240 yards: approximately 1.27 statute miles or 2.048 kilometres. It was used in Ireland from the 16th century plantations until the 19th century, with residual use into the 20th century.

Dutch

The Dutch mile has had different definitions throughout history. One of the older definitions was 5,600 ells. But the length of an ell was not standardised, so that the length of a mile could range between 3,280 m and 4,280 m. The Dutch mile also has had historical definitions of one hour's walking, which meant around 5 km, or 20,000 Amsterdam or Rhineland feet (respectively 5,660 m or 6,280 m). Besides the common Dutch mile, there is also the geographical mile. 15 geographical Dutch miles equal one degree of longitude on the equator. Its value changed as the circumference of the earth was estimated to a better precision. But at the time of usage, it was around 7,157 m. The metric system was introduced in the Netherlands in 1816, and the metric mile became a synonym for the kilometre, being exactly 1,000 m. Since 1870, the term  was replaced by the equivalent . Today, the word  is no longer used, except as part of certain proverbs and compound terms like  ("miles away").

German

The German mile was 24,000 German feet. The standardised Austrian mile used in southern Germany and the Austrian Empire was 7.586 km; the Prussian mile used in northern Germany was 7.5325 km. Following its standardisation by Ole Rømer in the late 17th century, the Danish mile was precisely equal to the Prussian mile and likewise divided into 24,000 feet. These were sometimes treated as equivalent to 7.5 km. The Germans also used a longer version of the geographical mile.

Breslau

The Breslau mile, used in Breslau, and from 1630 officially in all of Silesia, equal to 11,250 ells, or about 6,700 meters. The mile equaled the distance from the Piaskowa Gate all the way to Psie Pole (Hundsfeld). By rolling a circle with a radius of 5 ells through Piaskowa Island, Ostrów Tumski and suburban tracts, passing eight bridges on the way, the standard Breslau mile was determined.

Saxon

Hungarian

The Hungarian mile ( or ) varied from 8.3790 km to 8.9374 km before being standardised as 8.3536 km.

Portuguese

The Portuguese mile used in Portugal and Brazil was 2.0873 km prior to metrication.

Russian

The Russian mile ( or) was 7.468 km, divided into 7 versts.

Croatian

 The Croatian mile, first devised by the Jesuit Stjepan Glavač on a 1673 map, is the length of an arc of the equator subtended by ° or 11.13 km exactly. The previous Croatian mile, now known as the "ban mile", had been the Austrian mile given above.

Ottoman
The Ottoman mile was 1,894.35 m (1.17709 mi), which was equal to 5,000 Ottoman foot. After 1933, the Ottoman mile was replaced with the modern Turkish mile (1,853.181 m).

International
It was established as part of the 1959 international yard and pound agreement reached by the United States, the United Kingdom, Canada, Australia, New Zealand, and the Union of South Africa, which resolved small but measurable differences that had arisen from separate physical standards each country had maintained for the yard. As with the earlier statute mile, it continues to comprise 1,760 yards or 5,280 feet.

The old Imperial value of the yard was used in converting measurements to metric values in India in a 1976 Act of the Indian Parliament. However, the current National Topographic Database of the Survey of India is based on the metric WGS-84 datum, which is also used by the Global Positioning System.

The difference from the previous standards was 2 ppm, or about 3.2 millimetres ( inch) per mile. The U.S. standard was slightly longer and the old Imperial standards had been slightly shorter than the international mile. When the international mile was introduced in English-speaking countries, the basic geodetic datum in America was the North American Datum of 1927 (NAD27). This had been constructed by triangulation based on the definition of the foot in the Mendenhall Order of 1893, with 1 foot =  (≈0.304800609601) metres and the definition was retained for data derived from NAD27, but renamed the U.S. survey foot to distinguish it from the international foot. Thus a survey mile =  × 5280 (≈1609.347218694) metres. An international mile = 1609.344 / ( × 5280)  (=0.999998) survey miles.

The exact length of the land mile varied slightly among English-speaking countries until the international yard and pound agreement in 1959 established the yard as exactly 0.9144 metres, giving a mile of exactly 1,609.344 metres. The U.S. adopted this international mile for most purposes, but retained the pre-1959 mile for some land-survey data, terming it the U. S. survey mile. In the United States, statute mile normally refers to the survey mile, about 3.219 mm ( inch) longer than the international mile (the international mile is exactly 0.0002% less than the U.S. survey mile).

While most countries abandoned the mile when switching to the metric system, the international mile continues to be used in some countries, such as Liberia, Myanmar, the United Kingdom and the United States. It is also used in a number of territories with less than a million inhabitants, most of which are U.K. or U.S. territories, or have close historical ties with the U.K. or U.S.: American Samoa, Bahamas, Belize, British Virgin Islands, Cayman Islands, Dominica, Falkland Islands, Grenada, Guam, The N. Mariana Islands, Samoa, St. Lucia, St. Vincent & The Grenadines, St. Helena, St. Kitts & Nevis, the Turks & Caicos Islands, and the U.S. Virgin Islands.
The mile is even encountered in Canada, though this is predominantly in rail transport and horse racing, as the roadways have been metricated since 1977. The Republic of Ireland gradually replaced miles with kilometres, including in speed measurements; the process was completed in 2005.

U.S. survey 

The U.S. survey mile is 5,280 U.S. survey feet, or 1,609.347 metres and 0.30480061 metres respectively. Both are very slightly longer than the international mile and international foot. But in some cases, such as in the U.S. State Plane Coordinate Systems (SPCSs), which can stretch over hundreds of miles, the accumulated difference can be significant, so it is important to note that the reference is to the U.S. survey mile.

The United States redefined its yard in 1893, and this resulted in U.S. and Imperial measures of distance having very slightly different lengths.

The North American Datum of 1983 (NAD83), which replaced the NAD27, is defined in metres. State Plane Coordinate Systems were then updated, but the National Geodetic Survey left individual states to decide which (if any) definition of the foot they would use. All State Plane Coordinate Systems are defined in metres, and 42 of the 50 states only use the metre-based State Plane Coordinate Systems. However, eight states also have State Plane Coordinate Systems defined in feet, seven of them in U.S. survey feet and one in international feet.

State legislation in the U.S. is important for determining which conversion factor from the metric datum is to be used for land surveying and real estate transactions, even though the difference (2 ppm) is hardly significant, given the precision of normal surveying measurements over short distances (usually much less than a mile). Twenty-four states have legislated that surveying measures be based on the U.S. survey foot, eight have legislated that they be based on the international foot, and eighteen have not specified which conversion factor to use.

SPCS 83 legislation refers to state legislation that has been passed or updated using the newer 1983 NAD data. Most states have done so. Two states (Alaska and Missouri) and two jurisdictions (Guam and Puerto Rico) do not specify which foot to use. Additionally, two states (Alabama and Hawaii) and four jurisdictions (the District of Columbia, U.S. Virgin Islands, American Samoa and Northern Mariana Islands) do not have SPCS 83 legislation.

In October 2019, U.S. National Geodetic Survey and National Institute of Standards and Technology announced their joint intent to retire the U.S. survey foot and U.S. survey mile, as permitted by their 1959 decision, with effect on January 1, 2023.

Nautical

The nautical mile was originally defined as one minute of arc along a meridian of the Earth. Navigators use dividers to step off the distance between two points on the navigational chart, then place the open dividers against the minutes-of-latitude scale at the edge of the chart, and read off the distance in nautical miles. The Earth is not perfectly spherical but an oblate spheroid, so the length of a minute of latitude increases by 1% from the equator to the poles. Using the WGS84 ellipsoid, the commonly accepted Earth model for many purposes today, one minute of latitude at the WGS84 equator is 6,046 feet and at the poles is 6,107.5 feet. The average is about 6,076 feet (about 1,852 metres or 1.15 statute miles).

In the United States, the nautical mile was defined in the 19th century as 6,080.2 feet (1,853.249 m), whereas in the United Kingdom, the Admiralty nautical mile was defined as 6,080 feet (1,853.184 m) and was about one minute of latitude in the latitudes of the south of the UK. Other nations had different definitions of the nautical mile, but it is now internationally defined to be exactly .

Related units
The nautical mile per hour is known as the knot. Nautical miles and knots are almost universally used for aeronautical and maritime navigation, because of their relationship with degrees and minutes of latitude and the convenience of using the latitude scale on a map for distance measuring.

The data mile is used in radar-related subjects and is equal to 6,000 feet (1.8288 kilometres). The radar mile is a unit of time (in the same way that the light year is a unit of distance), equal to the time required for a radar pulse to travel a distance of two miles (one mile each way). Thus, the radar statute mile is 10.8 μs and the radar nautical mile is 12.4 μs.

Geographical

The geographical mile is based upon the length of a meridian of latitude. The German geographical mile was previously ° of latitude (7.4127 km).

Grid system
Cities in the continental United States often have streets laid out by miles. Detroit, Indianapolis, Chicago, Phoenix, Philadelphia, Las Vegas, Los Angeles, and Miami, are several examples. Typically the largest streets are about a mile apart, with others at smaller intervals. In the Manhattan borough of New York City "streets" are close to 20 per mile, while the major numbered "avenues" are about six per mile. (Centerline to centerline, 42nd Street to 22nd Street is supposed to be 5,250 feet while 42nd Street to 62nd Street is supposed to be  5,276 ft 8 in.)

Metric

The 1500 meters is the premier middle distance running event in Olympic sports.

Scandinavian

The Scandinavian mile remains in common use in Norway and Sweden, where it has meant precisely 10 km since metrication in 1889. It is used in informal situations and in measurements of fuel consumption, which are often given as litres per . In formal situations (such as official road signs) and where confusion may occur with international miles, it is avoided in favour of kilometres.

The Swedish mile was standardised as 36,000 Swedish feet or 10.6884 km in 1649; before that it varied by province from about 6 to 14.485 km.

Before metrication, the Norwegian mile was 11.298 km.

Comparison table
A comparison of the different lengths for a "mile", in different countries and at different times in history, is given in the table below. Leagues are also included in this list because, in terms of length, they fall in between the short West European miles and the long North, Central and Eastern European miles.

Similar units:
 1,066.8 m – verst, see also Obsolete Russian units of measurement

Idioms
Even in English-speaking countries that have moved from the Imperial to the metric system (for example, Australia, Canada, or New Zealand), the mile is still used in a variety of idioms. These include:
 A country mile is used colloquially to denote a very long distance.
 "A miss is as good as a mile" (failure by a narrow margin is no better than any other failure)
 "Give him an inch and he'll take a mile" – a corruption of "Give him an inch and he'll take an ell" (the person in question will become greedy if shown generosity)
 "Missed by a mile" (missed by a wide margin)
 "Go a mile a minute" (move very quickly)
 "Talk a mile a minute" (speak at a rapid rate)
 "To go the extra mile" (to put in extra effort)
 "Miles away" (lost in thought, or daydreaming)
 "Milestone" (an event indicating significant progress)

See also

Notes

References

Citations

Bibliography
 .
 .
 .
 .
 .
 .
 .
 .
 
 
 .
 .
 .
 .
 .
 .
 .  & 
 .
 .
 .
 .
 .
 .
 .
 .

Further reading
 
  (Item notes: Sammlung5-6 (1856–57) Original from Harvard University Digitized 9 January 2008)
 
 

Ancient Roman geography
Customary units of measurement in the United States
Imperial units
Obsolete Scottish units of measurement
Surveying
Units of length
Croatian mile